Khvostsovo is a rural locality (a village) in Novlyanskoye Rural Settlement, Selivanovsky District, Vladimir Oblast, Russia. The population was 41 as of 2010.

Geography 
Khvostsovo is located 8 km west of Krasnaya Gorbatka (the district's administrative centre) by road. Yershovo is the nearest rural locality.

References 

Rural localities in Selivanovsky District